HMS Southampton was a 50-gun fourth rate ship of the line of the Royal Navy, launched at Southampton on 10 June 1693.

She underwent a rebuild at Deptford in 1700 as a fourth rate of between 46 and 54 guns. Southampton was hulked in 1728, and continued in this role until 1771, when she was broken up.

Notes

References

Lavery, Brian (2003) The Ship of the Line - Volume 1: The development of the battlefleet 1650-1850. Conway Maritime Press. .

Ships of the line of the Royal Navy
1690s ships